Varqeh-ye Olya (also Romanized as Varqeh-ye ‘Olyā; also known as Varqeh-ye Bālā) is a village in Varqeh Rural District, in the Central District of Charuymaq County, East Azerbaijan Province, Iran. At the 2006 census, its population was 448, in 84 families.

References 

Populated places in Charuymaq County